The 6th Mountain Artillery Regiment is an inactive field artillery regiment of the Italian Army, specializing in mountain combat. Since their formation the Mountain Artillery Regiments have served alongside the Alpini, the mountain infantry speciality of the Italian Army, that distinguished itself in combat during World War I and World War II. The Alpini and Mountain Artillery regiments share, besides their close history, the distinctive Cappello Alpino.

External links
 6th Mountain Artillery Regiment on vecio.it, page in Italian

Alpini
Artillery regiments of Italy
Regiments of Italy in World War I
Regiments of Italy in World War II